Steinar Schanke Eikum (born 6 October 1958 in Drøbak, Norway) was the original bassist in the Norwegian hard rock band TNT. He joined the band after doing an audition in the Easter of 1982, and played on their self-titled debut album the same year. He was replaced by Morty Black in 1983.

Before Eikum joined TNT, he played in the Oslo-based band Red. In 1987 he joined the Trondheim-based band Blonde on Blonde and recorded a self-titled album with them the following year. He quit the band in 1991, and joined the Ketil Stokkan Band in 1994.

Sources
 https://web.archive.org/web/20071007105904/http://www.helvetes.net/tnt/eikum.html

1958 births
Living people
People from Frogn
TNT (Norwegian band) members
Norwegian rock bass guitarists
Norwegian male bass guitarists